This is a selection of singer/songwriters, musicians and bands from Winnipeg, Manitoba, Canada.

Bands

Alphabet Soup Children's Entertainment
Bachman–Turner Overdrive
Begonia
burnthe8track
Comeback Kid
Crash Test Dummies
The Details
The Duhks
Duotang
Eagle & Hawk
Easily Amused
Electro Quarterstaff
Figure Four
Grand Analog
The Guess Who
Harlequin
High Five Drive
Imaginary Cities
Jet Set Satellite
The Judes
KEN mode
Kittens
McMaster and James
Mood Ruff
Nathan
New Meanies
Novillero
Painted Thin
Paper Moon
Petric
The Paperbacks
The Perpetrators
Propagandhi
Purple City
Royal Canoe
Starfield
Streetheart
Swallowing Shit
Tin Foil Phoenix
Wailin' Jennys
The Waking Eyes
The Watchmen
The Weakerthans
You Know I Know

Solo artists, singer/songwriters

Chad Allan
Maria Aragon
Randy Bachman
Tal Bachman
Del Barber
Steve Bell
Heather Bishop
Oscar Brand
Lenny Breau
Chris Burke-Gaffney
Marco Castillo
Burton Cummings
Stu Davis
Mitch Dorge
Amanda Falk
Christine Fellows
Goody Grace
Joey Gregorash
Terry Jacks
Cat Jahnke
David James
Rob James
James Keelaghan
Mike Keller
Ash Koley
Chantal Kreviazuk
Daniel Lavoie
Gisele MacKenzie
Fraser MacPherson
Greg MacPherson
Romi Mayes
Alexander McCowan
Loreena McKennitt
Holly McNarland
Ruth Moody
Sierra Noble
Bob Nolan
Fred Penner
William Prince
Bob Rock
Pete Samples
John K. Samson
Remy Shand
Shingoose
Al Simmons
Terry Spencer
Venetian Snares
Beth Torbert, better known as Bif Naked
Lindy Vopnfjörð
Maiko Watson
Neil Young
Young Kidd

Classical musicians, composers, conductors 

Endre Johannes Cleven (b. 1874 Norway, d. 1916 Manitoba)
Tracy Dahl
Randolph Peters

 
Winnipeg
Musicians